The Pioneer Conference was a short-lived intercollegiate athletic conference that existed from 1947 to 1949. The league had members in the state of Illinois.

Football champions

1947 – Quincy (IL)
1948 – Quincy (IL)
1949 – Quincy (IL)

See also
List of defunct college football conferences

References

Defunct college sports conferences in the United States
College sports in Illinois